"Sure Know Something" is a song by American hard rock band Kiss, released on their 1979 album Dynasty. The B-side is "Dirty Livin'", another album track featured on the Dynasty album which was co-written and sung by drummer Peter Criss.

Written by vocalist/guitarist Paul Stanley and producer Vini Poncia, "Sure Know Something" reached number 47 on the U.S. Billboard Hot 100 singles chart in 1979, and in the Top Ten in some countries around the world. It would become another top ten hit (number 5) for the band in Australia.

Cash Box said the song "has a rock-anthemic quality" and praised the hook.  Record World called it a "megarocker that bowls you over with sheer power and enthusiasm."

A promotional video, directed by John Goodhue, was filmed for the single and featured the band on a mock-up of what was their Dynasty-era stage show. "Sure Know Something" was performed by the band acoustically during their MTV Unplugged performance in 1995 and with the Melbourne Symphony Ensemble on their live album Kiss Symphony: Alive IV.

The song incorporates disco music into the usual style of a rock ballad. It is one of two disco rock hits for the band, the other being "I Was Made for Lovin' You". It is seen as being one of the more sophisticated songs written by Stanley, with critics noting the heartfelt feelings of confusion and sorrow. The song musically and lyrically is darker than most Kiss songs, with the song being played in a minor key and the lyrics referring to being overwhelmed by loss of virginity.

Studio personnel
 Paul Stanley – lead vocals, rhythm & lead guitar
 Gene Simmons – bass
 Ace Frehley – additional guitar, backing vocals
 Anton Fig – drums
 Vini Poncia – keyboards, backing vocals

Chart performance

Weekly Charts

Year-end charts

References

Kiss (band) songs
1979 singles
Songs about heartache
Songs written by Vini Poncia
Songs written by Paul Stanley
Casablanca Records singles